Policegiri is a 2013 Indian Hindi-language action film directed by K.S. Ravikumar and produced by T. P. Aggarwal and Rahul Aggarwal. The film features Sanjay Dutt, Prakash Raj and Prachi Desai in the lead roles. The film was released on 5 July 2013.

The film is the official remake of the 2003 Tamil film Saamy, directed by Hari.

Plot

The movie begins with a man (Sanjay Dutt) drinking beer early in the morning and then following up with having beer and idli. He later steals a bike and goes to the police station to get commission from the police inspector. He then meets a man who takes him to a place where they sell guns and bombs. Finally, he meets a local gangster who hires him to kill a minister. He then kills the gangster and his henchmen and reveals himself as DCP Rudra Aditya Devraj, the new cop in town, near the Andhra Pradesh-Maharashtra border.

The city of Karimnagar is riddled with crime and corruption and is controlled by Nagori Subramaniam (Prakash Raj) the local mafia. Initially, Rudra closes down a lot of businesses of Nagori. But when Rudra meets Nagori, he reveals that he is also corrupt cop like others and even takes bribe on a condition that Nagori accepts certain points. Nagori accepts and there is truce between the two.

Conflict starts when residents complain about a petrol bunk selling less petrol to the public and a lady beaten up when she complained. The bunk is owned by Nagori. Rudra beats up the employees of the bunk as well as Nagori's henchmen. A war emerges between the two.

Nagori then calls for a bandh of the market place. But on the day of bandh, Rudra and his team are prepared and drive away all the protestors. Rudra becomes a hero for the people of the city. But Nagori exacts his revenge by causing a riot in the market place and also blowing up a bomb killing many people on the very same day Rudra is marrying Seher (Prachi Desai). Nagori then tries to kidnap Seher but Rudra saves her life in time. Rudra's activities invites the wrath of the police commissioner, who tries to control Rudra but in vain.

Rudra then receives his transfer orders and has seven days left in the town. He challenges Nagori that seven days is enough to finish him. The next day, Nagori's men take out a procession with the aim to kill Rudra. But Rudra and his team are prepared and he along with his men kill many of Nagori's men including a MLA and blames the crowd for the mishaps.

Rudra then kidnaps Nagori's close accomplice who confess for his and Nagori's involvement in the bomb blast and gets a warrant to arrest Nagori. Rudra is then called to a meeting by the commissioner where MLAs, MPs, Senior Police Officers and Ministers threaten him. He smartly controls them by claiming that his pen has a camera and a voice recorder and he'll release the footage to media. Nagori goes into hiding after knowing that Rudra can't be stopped.

A couple of days later, Rudra catches Nagori who is dressed as a beggar near the temple. He takes Nagori to secluded spot after beating all his henchmen. He then kills Nagori by burning him to death ensuring that Nagori is never found and is declared as a wanted criminal.

Cast

Production
The movie was rumoured to be called Thanedaar – Part 2, referring to a previous hit movie of Sanjay Dutt did during his younger days. However Dutt did not feel comfortable with the movie backing on the success of Thanedaar, considering the fact that the story was not written keeping in mind the original Thanedaar. Furthermore, the directors and producers of the original Thanedaar were different. Subsequently, Sanjay Dutt suggested to brainstorm for another name. He suggested Policegiri and the unit was happy to call this movie Policegiri. Policegiri was actually not a word in use but something Sanjay Dutt created.

Soundtrack

The soundtrack album was composed by Himesh Reshammiya and Meet Bros Anjjan. The music rights was bought by T-Series. Lyrics were penned by Shabbir Ahmed and Aslam Lashkariya.

Reception

Critical response
The film received extremely poor reviews from critics.

Box office
Policegiri recorded an average opening and did extremely poor multiplex business although single screens fared much better where it remained in theatres for three weeks recording 57 cr after its four-week run across India. The film was declared as average by Box Office India.

References

External links
 

2013 films
Films shot in Tamil Nadu
Hindi remakes of Tamil films
Indian action comedy films
Fictional portrayals of the Maharashtra Police
Films directed by K. S. Ravikumar
Films scored by Himesh Reshammiya
Films scored by Meet Bros Anjjan
2013 masala films
T-Series (company) films
2013 action comedy films
2010s Hindi-language films